Hiram Lay Cobblestone Farmhouse, also known as the Cobblestone House at 1145 Old School House Road, is a historic home located at Tyre in Seneca County, New York.  It is a -story, five bay, cobblestone farmhouse with Greek Revival style detailing.  It has a side gable roof and one-story rear kitchen wing.  The roof is topped by a hip roofed cupola.  Also on the property is a contributing brick smokehouse.   It is the only cobblestone building in Tyre and one of 18 remaining in Seneca County.

It was listed on the National Register of Historic Places in 2009.

References

Houses on the National Register of Historic Places in New York (state)
Greek Revival houses in New York (state)
Cobblestone architecture
Houses completed in 1848
Houses in Seneca County, New York
National Register of Historic Places in Seneca County, New York